Lego DC Super Hero Girls was a Lego theme based on the DC Super Hero Girls franchise. It is licensed from DC Comics and Warner Bros. Animation. The theme was first introduced in November 2016. The toy line was accompanied by several shorts, a television special and films based on Lego DC Super Hero Girls. The Lego DC Super Hero Girls theme was discontinued by the end of 2018.

Overview
Lego DC Super Hero Girls was based on the DC Super Hero Girls franchise. The product line focuses on the DC Super Hero Girls characters from Super Hero High School. At Super Hero High School, well-known DC heroes attend challenging classes and deal with all the awkwardness of growing up with the added stress of having unique superpowers. Lego DC Super Hero Girls aimed to recreate the main characters in Lego form, including Wonder Woman, Supergirl, Batgirl, Bumblebee, Harley Quinn and Poison Ivy.

Development
The Lego DC Super Hero Girls theme aimed to introduce a product line that reimagines female DC superheroes and supervillains in Lego form as students at high school. In partnership with Warner Bros. Consumer Products and DC Entertainment, the theme aimed to provide children with a "relatable world filled with aspirational characters, immersive stories and action-packed missions that inspire girls aged 7-10 to be smart, courageous and empowered to be an everyday Super Hero".

Each of the sets featured the Lego DC Super Hero Girls characters revamped as mini-doll figures and gave them new looks which were also used in the Lego Friends, Lego Disney Princess and Lego Elves themes.

Launch
The Lego DC Super Hero Girls theme was launched early in the US on 5 October 2016. The Lego Group announced the first wave of six construction sets based on the DC Super Hero Girls franchise on 27 November 2016 in the U.S., Canada, and Mexico, followed by a global launch in January 2017. The sets featured buildings, vehicles and mini-doll figures, including Wonder Woman, Supergirl, Batgirl, Bumblebee, Harley Quinn and Poison Ivy and several villains, including Eclipso, Lashina, Lena Luthor and Mad Harriet. The second wave of sets was launched at the New York Toy Fair in 1 August 2017.

In addition, The Lego Group built two life-sized models of Harley Quinn and Supergirl, two characters that appear in the DC Super Hero Girls franchise. The Harley Quinn model consisted of 12,789 Lego bricks, measured 5'3" in height and weighed 63 lbs. The Supergirl model consisted of 14,210 Lego bricks, measured 5'5" in height and weighed 70 lbs. They were placed in front of New York Comic-Con.

Characters

Superheroes
Wonder Woman: She is 317 years old and has sneaked away from the Amazons' island home of Themyscira in order to fulfill her dream of protecting the mortal world. Upon reaching the city of Metropolis, she learns to pass herself off as a typical high school student with help from the other main characters.  Voiced by Grey Griffin.
Supergirl: She is a central protagonist in the web series Lego DC Super Hero Girls where she is a student at Super Hero High. Voiced by Anais Fairweather.
Batgirl: She is a student at Super Hero High and is an extremely intelligent genius. She is a tomboy and loves to investigate criminals. Voiced by Ashlyn Selich.
Bumblebee: She is a student at Super Hero High. Voiced by Teala Dunn.
Harley Quinn: She is a student at Super Hero High and the roommate of Wonder Woman. Unusually for the character, she is portrayed as a hero instead of a villain and has a mostly positive relationship with her superhero counterparts. Voiced by Tara Strong.
Poison Ivy: She is a student at Super Hero High. She is a kind person. In contrast with her DC Comics counterpart, she is hero and cooperates with other heroes like Wonder Woman and Batgirl. Voiced by Tara Strong.
Steve Trevor: He is a waiter at Capes and Cowls Cafe, which is owned by his father. Voiced by Josh Keaton.
The Flash: He is a student at Super Hero High in Lego DC Super Hero Girls series. Voiced by Josh Keaton.
Krypto: Supergirl's dog.

Supervillains
Eclipso: She is the secondary antagonist in Lego DC Super Hero Girls: Brain Drain. She is a secret ally of Lena Luthor. Voiced by Mona Marshall.
Lashina: She is a whip-wielding member of The Female Furies. In Lego DC Super Hero Girls: Brain Drain, she and Mad Harriet are assisting Lena Luthor. In Lego DC Super Hero Girls: Super-Villain High, she takes the name Backlash as she joins Lena Luthor's team of villains. Voiced by Meredith Salenger.
Lena Luthor: She is the main antagonist of the Lego DC Super Hero Girls series. Unlike the main series, instead of avenging her brother's arrest at the hands of the heroes, she wishes to surpass him as a true supervillain, but she never succeeds. She's developed a series of Kryptomites with one of six different colors each, which affect everyone that comes near them by changing their emotions, such as anger, sadness, fear, distrust and forgetfulness, while the green ones only act as normal kryptonite that only affect Supergirl. She's usually seen assisting the Female Furies and Eclipso, though she always hinders the plans of the latter in the end, hindering her own plan in the process. Voiced by Romi Dames.
Mad Harriet: She is a vicious member of The Female Furies. She wears metal claws. She appears in Lego DC Super Hero Girls: Brain Drain and voiced by Jennifer Hale.

Construction sets 
According to Bricklink, The Lego Group released a total of 11 Lego sets and promotional polybag as part of Lego DC Super Hero Girls theme. It was discontinued by the end of 2018.

First wave 
In October 2016, New York Comic-Con had announced that an exclusive Batgirl mini-doll figure  would be given away to the winners before the toy sets was released. The next month, The Lego Group announced that the first wave of sets based on the DC Super Hero Girls franchise was released on 27 November 2016. The six sets being released were Batgirl Batjet Chase (set number: 41230), Harley Quinn to the Rescue (set number: 41231), Super Hero High School (set number: 41232), Lashina Tank (set number: 41233), Bumblebee Helicopter (set number: 41234) and Wonder Woman Dorm Room (set number: 41235). In addition, Krypto Saves the Day (set number: 30546) polybag set was released as a promotion.

Second wave 
The second wave of sets was launched at the New York Toy Fair on 1 August 2017. The four sets being released were Harley Quinn Dorm (set number: 41236), Batgirl Secret Bunker (set number: 41237), Lena Luthor Kryptomite Factory (set number: 41238) and Eclipso Dark Palace (set number: 41239). The sets were designed primarily for girls aged 7 to 12 years old.

Web shorts 
The product line was accompanied by a series of animated short films that was released on YouTube inspired by both the DC Super Hero Girls franchise as well as the Lego toyline.

Lego DC Super Hero Girls (Shorts) 
The 10 web shorts have been released on YouTube.

TV specials and films

Lego DC Super Hero Girls: Galactic Wonder (2017) 
Lego DC Super Hero Girls: Galactic Wonder is a five-part computer-animated series based on DC Super Hero Girls franchise and Lego toyline released on the YouTube channels of DC Super Hero Girls and LEGO on 27 April 2017. It also premiered on Cartoon Network in Europe on 24 September 2017 and on Boomerang in Australia on 13 October 2017.

Lego DC Super Hero Girls: Brain Drain (2017) 

Lego DC Super Hero Girls: Brain Drain is an American computer-animated direct-to-video film based on the DC Super Hero Girls franchise, produced by Warner Bros. Animation. It is the third film in the DC Super Hero Girls franchise, as well as the first in the series to be based on the DC Super Hero Girls brand of Lego. It was digitally released on July 25, 2017, and was followed by a DVD release on August 8, 2017. The movie premiered on Cartoon Network in the US on November 19, 2017.

Lego DC Super Hero Girls: Super-Villain High (2018) 

Lego DC Super Hero Girls: Super-Villain High is an American computer-animated direct-to-video film based on the DC Super Hero Girls franchise, produced by Warner Bros. Animation. It is the fourth film in the DC Super Hero Girls franchise, as well as the second and final Lego branded film in the series to be based on the DC Super Hero Girls, before the franchise itself got rebooted by Lauren Faust in January 2019. It was digitally released on May 1, 2018, and was followed by a DVD release on May 15, 2018.

Lawsuit 
In August 2017, Hasbro filed a lawsuit that attempted to block sales of Lego DC Super Hero Girls sets due to the possibility of the Bumblebee character being confused with the Transformers character of the same name.

See also 
Lego Friends
Lego Disney
Lego Elves
Lego Batman
Lego Super Heroes
Lego Minifigures (theme)
The Lego Movie
The Lego Movie 2: The Second Part
The Lego Batman Movie
Mixels
Lego Scooby-Doo
Lego Unikitty!
Lego The Powerpuff Girls

Notes

References

External links
 

DC Super Hero Girls
DC Super Hero Girls
Products introduced in 2016
DC Comics action figure lines
Products and services discontinued in 2017